H. Louis Fitzgerald (August 25, 1919 – January 27, 2013) was an American professional baseball player, scout and manager.

A native and lifelong resident of Cleveland, Tennessee, he was a second baseman and third baseman in his playing days (1942; 1946–1957).  The ,  Fitzergald batted left-handed and threw right-handed.

Longtime minor league manager
In a 20-year (1951–1970) managing career in the minor leagues, Fitzergald won 1,241 games, losing 1,171 (.515). He began his managing career as a playing skipper with unaffiliated teams in the low minors such as the Class D Sooner State League and Evangeline League, but in 1957 he began working for Major League affiliates in the farm systems of the Baltimore Orioles, Houston Colt .45s/Astros, Cincinnati Reds and Atlanta Braves.

In , as skipper of the Buffalo Bisons of the Triple-A International League, Fitzgerald managed a young Johnny Bench, the future Baseball Hall of Fame catcher.  However, on July 5, 1967, Fitzgerald swapped jobs with the Reds' Double-A Knoxville Smokies manager, Don Zimmer, and Zimmer would be Bench's last minor league pilot before his promotion to Cincinnati. Fitzgerald was also a longtime associate of Paul Richards, working under Richards with Baltimore, Houston and Atlanta.

Scout for Pirates, Braves and Marlins
Fitzgerald also served as a Tennessee-based scout for the Pittsburgh Pirates (1976), Braves (1982–1990) and Florida Marlins (1991–1993).  He was accorded numerous honors during his 55-year baseball career, including membership in the Professional Scouts Hall of Fame and the "sports halls of fame" of Tennessee, Chattanooga, San Antonio, and his home city of Cleveland, where he served as director of the municipal recreation department.

He died at age 93 in Cleveland, Tennessee.

References

 Johnson, Lloyd, ed., The Minor League Register. Durham, North Carolina: Baseball America, 1994.
 Montague, John, and Howe News Bureau, Atlanta Braves 1982 and 1984 Organization Books. St. Petersburg, Florida: The Baseball Library.
 Baseball America Annual Directory, 1986 through 1993 inclusive. Durham, North Carolina: Baseball America.

1919 births
2013 deaths
Americus Pioneers players
Atlanta Braves scouts
Augusta Rams players
Buffalo Bisons (minor league) managers
Dallas Eagles players
Durham Bulls managers
Greenville Majors players
Kingsport Cherokees players
Longview Cherokees players
Miami Marlins scouts
Natchez Giants players
Pensacola Dons players
Pensacola Fliers players
People from Cleveland, Tennessee
Pittsburgh Pirates scouts
Port Arthur Sea Hawks players
Shawnee Hawks players
Texarkana Bears players
Victoria Eagles players